Zvonimir Ciglič (February 20, 1921 - January 21, 2006) in Ljubljana  was a Slovenian composer.

See also
List of Slovenian composers

Sources
Slovenian Wikipedia

Slovenian composers
Male composers
1921 births
2006 deaths
Musicians from Ljubljana
Yugoslav musicians
Slovenian male musicians